Zahabad (also Romanized as Zahābād and Zehābād; also known as Zabad) is a village in Niyarak Rural District, Tarom Sofla District, Qazvin County, Qazvin Province, Iran. At the 2006 census, its population was 44, in 13 families.

References 

Populated places in Qazvin County